"Give It Up!" (German: "Gibs auf!") is a short story by Franz Kafka written between 1917 and 1923. The story was not published in Kafka's lifetime, but first appeared in Beschreibung eines Kampfes (1936, Description of a Struggle, translated 1958).

A comic-book adaptation of the story, illustrated by Peter Kuper, is included in Give It Up!.

References

External links 

Short stories by Franz Kafka
Short stories published posthumously